The Graham and Laird, Schober and Mitchell Factories were two historic factory buildings that were located in the Franklintown neighborhood of Philadelphia, Pennsylvania. 

They were added to the National Register of Historic Places in 1978.

History and architectural features
The Graham factory was built between 1885 and 1886, and the Laird, Schober and Mitchell Factory was erected in 1891. Both were heavy timber framed brick buildings. 

The John C. Graham company made ladies dresses while the Laird, Schober and Mitchell made shoes. 

The buildings were added to the National Register of Historic Places in 1978. They have since been demolished.

References

Industrial buildings and structures on the National Register of Historic Places in Philadelphia
Industrial buildings completed in 1886
Industrial buildings completed in 1891
Shoe factories
Textile mills in the United States